Susan Douglas may refer to:

Susan Douglas Rubeš (1925–2013), Canadian actress
Sue Douglas (born 1957), British media executive
Susan J. Douglas, American academic

See also
Susan L. Douglass, American-born Muslim
Suzzanne Douglas (1957–2021), American actress